The 1963 Soviet Class A Second Group was the inaugural season of the Soviet Class A Second Group football competitions that was reorganized based on the best teams of the 1962 Soviet Class B season. It was also the 23rd season of the Soviet second tier league competition. 

The league was consolidated into a single group of 18 clubs.

Qualified teams

Notes:
 FC Kuban Krasnodar was previously called as Spartak.
 FC Volga Gorkiy was added after merger of Torpedo Gorkiy and Raketa Gorkiy.
 FC Karpaty Lvov replaced SKA Lvov.

Final standings

Top scorers
13 goals
 Anatoli Isayev (Shinnik Yaroslavl)
 Viktor Korolkov (Shakhter Karaganda)

12 goals
 Valentyn Hrishyn (Trudovye Rezervy Lugansk)
 Albert Liber (Trud Voronezh)

11 goals
 Vitaliy Kovalenko (Metallurg Zaporozhie)

Number of teams by republics

See also
 1963 Soviet Top League
 1963 Soviet Class B

External links
 1963 season. RSSSF

1963
2
Soviet
Soviet